The Shanksville Volunteer Fire Department is a volunteer fire department in Shanksville, Pennsylvania. The department provides fire protection and emergency medical services to the boroughs of Shanksville and Indian Lake as well as to Stonycreek Township. Additionally the department is responsible for a  stretch of the Pennsylvania Turnpike.

September 11 terrorist attacks

On September 11, 2001, the Shanksville Volunteer Fire Department responded to the United Airlines Flight 93 crash scene to search for survivors. None of the 44 people on board survived. Flight 93 was one of four airliners hijacked that day as part of the al-Qaeda terror attack on the United States. It is widely held that the Flight 93 hijackers intended to use the aircraft to attack the United States Capitol building in Washington, DC. 

Assistant chief Rick King, was one of the first on scene - accompanied by firefighters Keith Custer, Merle Flick and Robert Kelly - within seven or eight minutes. He was later joined by Chief Terry Shaffer and Somerset County coroner Wallace "Wally" Miller. King also ordered at least five other local companies, including the county hazmat unit, to the crash site.

Knowing it would be an active crime scene, firefighters extinguished fires and gathered debris from the plane using driptorches, rakes and shovels, until FBI officials from Pittsburgh arrived on-scene at around 2pm, the firefighters joined the Pennsylvania State Police in securing the crash site as they investigated.

Shanksville Firehouse memorial 
New York City fire fighters donated a memorial made from a steel cross from the World Trade Center and mounted atop a platform shaped like the Pentagon. Hundreds of firefighters riding motorcycles escorted the beams from New York City to Shanksville. It was installed outside the firehouse on August 25, 2008.

See also 
 United Airlines Flight 93
 Flight 93 National Memorial

References

Fire departments in Pennsylvania
Somerset County, Pennsylvania
United Airlines Flight 93